Sandviksfjellet is a mountain in the city of Bergen in Vestland county, Norway.  It is one of the traditional seven mountains that surround the city centre of Bergen. The mountain lies on the east side of the city neighborhood of Sandviken, just north of the mountain Fløyen.  The European route E39 highway runs through the mountain as part of the Fløyfjell Tunnel.

The hiking route called Stoltzekleiven the path used for a yearly mountain run, where Jon Tvedt holds the record.

See also
List of mountains of Norway

References

Mountains of Bergen